Marija Prlja (Serbian Cyrillic: Марија Прља, born 11 December 1987 in Belgrade, SFR Yugoslavia) is a Serbian female basketball player. She plays at point guard position in Crvena zvezda.

References

External links
Profile at eurobasket.com
Profile  at kkzcrvenazvezda.rs

1987 births
Living people
Basketball players from Belgrade
Point guards
Serbian women's basketball players
ŽKK Partizan players
ŽKK Crvena zvezda players
Serbian expatriate basketball people in Bosnia and Herzegovina
Serbian expatriate basketball people in Romania
Serbian expatriate basketball people in the Czech Republic